Le glaive et la balance (English: The Sword and the Balance and Two Are Guilty)) is a 1963 French-Italian crime drama film directed by André Cayatte. It was written by Cayatte, Henri Jeanson and Charles Spaak and stars American actor Anthony Perkins as the protagonist.

Plot
On the French Riviera, after the son of a wealthy local woman is kidnapped for ransom, the police begin an investigation. The kidnappers manage to escape the police, killing their victim in the process, but three men are eventually discovered by the police at a lighthouse.

Cast
Anthony Perkins as Johnny Parson
Jean-Claude Brialy as Jean-Philippe Prévost 
Renato Salvatori as François Corbier 
Pascale Audret as Agnès
Anne Tonietti as Christine Prévost 
Marie Déa as Mme Winter

References

External links
 

1963 films
Italian crime drama films
French crime drama films
1963 crime drama films
Films directed by André Cayatte
Films set in France
Films set on the French Riviera
1960s Italian films
1960s French films